Olena Kovtun (born 20 November 1966) is a Ukrainian table tennis player. She competed at the 1988 Summer Olympics and the 2000 Summer Olympics.

References

External links
 

1966 births
Living people
Ukrainian female table tennis players
Olympic table tennis players of the Soviet Union
Olympic table tennis players of Ukraine
Table tennis players at the 1988 Summer Olympics
Table tennis players at the 2000 Summer Olympics
People from Bryansk
20th-century Ukrainian women